Harold Wallace Rosenthal (November 2, 1947 – August 11, 1976), was a senior aide to Senator Jacob K. Javits (R-NY). Rosenthal was murdered in a terrorist attack in Istanbul, Turkey. The Harold Rosenthal Fellowship in International Relations was established in his honor.

Career 
Rosenthal graduated from Cambridge University and Harvard University graduate school, both on scholarships.  After working for Congressman (later Governor) Hugh Carey (D-NY) he moved to the office of Senator Walter Mondale (D-MN) where he directed the senator's legislative agenda.  After a stint at the Rockefeller Brothers Fund, Rosenthal returned to the Senate to work as a senior aide to Jacob K. Javits of New York.

Murder 
On August 11, 1976, Rosenthal was one of four people murdered in a terrorist attack at the El Al gate in Istanbul, Turkey. Other victims included Yutaka Hirano, a tour guide from Japan, Ernest Eliash from Petach Tikvah and Shlomo Weisbachs along with over 20 injured. An American woman, Margaret Shearer was injured with a bullet in her ankle. Two captured attackers identified themselves to Turkish police as Mohamed Mehdi and Mohamed Husein al-Rashid of the Popular Front for the Liberation of Palestine.

In 1977, the Harold Rosenthal Fellowship in International Relations was established in his memory. Each year, 9 to 13 qualified students are given the opportunity to spend the summer in professional fellowships with a members of Congress or in  a government department. Applications are encouraged from graduate students interested in all branches of government.

Interview Conspiracy theory 
In 1978, a pamphlet entitled The Hidden Tyranny included an interview conducted by Walter White purportedly with Rosenthal that claimed Jewish Americans had implemented a Protocols of the Elders of Zion-style plan to take over the world. The pamphlet was republished in the 1990s and distributed in Idaho by the 11th Hour Remnant Messenger, funded by wealthy entrepreneurs Vincent Bertollini and Carl E. Story. The Anti-Defamation League has called it "a fabricated document" and questioned why the author would "wait to first publish the booklet until 1978, 18 months after he had spoken with Rosenthal, who was murdered in 1976." Tom Metzger reported in the White Aryan Resistance website "that interview never took place. Walter White operated free and loose on some subjects, like this one... that interview is bogus." Daniel Levitas in his book The Terrorist Next Door: The Militia Movement and the Radical Right attributed the bogus interview to White's wife, Opal Tanner White, an aide to Gerald L. K. Smith, writing "since Rosenthal was dead, White was free to attribute anything she wished—however scurrilous or hateful—to the onetime Javits aide."

See also 

 Sabena Flight 571 hijacking 
 El Al Flight 426 hijacking
 El Al Flight 253 attack
 Antisemitic canard

Notes

External links 

 Harold W. Rosenthal Fellowship in International Relations 

1947 births
1976 deaths
Murdered American Jews
Harvard University alumni
American people murdered abroad
American terrorism victims
People murdered in Turkey
Terrorism deaths in Turkey
Alumni of the University of Cambridge